Laloșu is a commune located in Vâlcea County, Oltenia, Romania. It is composed of six villages: Ghindari, Laloșu, Portărești, Mologești, Berbești and Oltețani.

References

Communes in Vâlcea County
Localities in Oltenia